Cuatro Caminos (translated from Spanish the name literally means "Four Roads") is a station of the Mexico City metro network. Colloquially known as "Metro Toreo", it is the current north terminus of Line 2. The adjacent Mexipuerto Cementos Fortaleza Cuatro Caminos mixed-use development opened in 2016 and houses, besides a shopping center, residential tower and sports facility, a bus terminal that is a hub for regional bus and minibus transport from and into the State of Mexico. In 2019, the station had an average ridership of 114,947 passengers per day, making it the third busiest station in the network.

As of 14 September 1970 Line 2 originally terminated at Metro Tacuba, but on 22 August 1984 the line was extended an additional two stations to reach the municipality of Naucalpan. The station sits on the dividing line between the Mexico City and the neighboring State of Mexico and as such was the first station of the network to be built outside the limits of the Federal District.

General information
The station logo is a large geodesic dome depicting the former nearby Toreo de Cuatro Caminos bull fighting ring, which the station takes its name from, however the bullring was torn down in 2008.  The station's surroundings (popularly known as the paradero), are the main public transport hub to Toluca and northwestern municipalities in the State of Mexico, such as Naucalpan, Atizapán, Tlalnepantla or Huixquilucan, as well as a major connection point to several destinations within the Mexico City proper and it also serves as the housing of a large street market, which is known largely because of its poor general conditions. Officially, no private vehicles are allowed in the area.

Upon leaving the station, there are two main corridors, labeled "North" and "South". North corridor (denoted by the exits A to K), is mainly used for transportation to State of Mexico, while the "South" corridor is mainly aimed at passengers going to the city (denoted by exit letters J to Z), though this is not strictly the case.

The South corridor (if walked) leads to the Mexipuerto bus terminal, the Toreo Parque Central and Pericentro shopping malls, the Anillo Periférico, and various military facilities, while the North corridor leads to the industrial complex of Naucalpan.

In 2003, the Mexican popular music group Café Tacuba produced an album with the title "Cuatro Caminos" in homage to this part of the city.

Exits
South: Avenida Ingenieros Militares, Colonia Argentina Poniente
North: Avenida 16 de septiembre, Colonia Transmisiones

Ridership

Gallery

See also 
 List of Mexico City metro stations

References

External links 

Cuatro Caminos
Railway stations opened in 1984
Naucalpan de Juárez
1984 establishments in Mexico
Mexico City Metro stations outside Mexico City
Accessible Mexico City Metro stations